Larrocha is an impact crater on Mercury.

Larrocha was named after Spanish pianist Alicia de Larrocha; this name was adopted by the International Astronomical Union (IAU) on June 18, 2013.

Larrocha contains abundant hollows, including a large patch on the east side that is over 15 km long.

See also 
 List of craters on Mercury

References 

Impact craters on Mercury